1862 in archaeology.

Excavations
 Re-excavation of Snape Anglo-Saxon Cemetery in eastern England under direction of landowner Septimus Davidson; a ship burial is uncovered.

Finds
 The Painted Cave of Galdar discovered at Gáldar, Las Palmas, on Gran Canaria.

Events

 Napoleon III establishes the National Archaeological Museum of France in the Château de Saint-Germain-en-Laye.

Births
 May 27: Francis Llewellyn Griffith, British Egyptologist (died 1934)
 October 26: Thomas J. Preston, Jr., American archaeologist (died 1955)
 November 26: Aurel Stein, Hungarian-born archaeologist (died 1943)

Deaths

See also
 List of years in archaeology
 1861 in archaeology
 1863 in archaeology

References

Archaeology
Archaeology by year
Archaeology
Archaeology